Brian Howell (born 1961) is a British author and teacher living and working near Tokyo, Japan.
He has published three novels and one short story collection since 1990. His first novel, The Dance of Geometry, and his first collection, The Sound of White Ants, were both reviewed favourably by Toby Lichtig in The London Magazine. His novels focus on Dutch seventeenth-century painters with an interest in optical devices. His stories have elements of the weird, fantasy, and magical realism.

Novels 
The Dance of Geometry, The Toby Press, 2002
The Curious Case of Jan Torrentius, Zagava (Düsseldorf, Germany), 2017
Sight Unseen, Zagava, 2019

Collections 
The Sound of White Ants, Elastic Press, 2004
The Stream and The Torrent: The Curious Case of Jan Torrentius and The Followers of the Rosy Cross, Vol.1, Zagava (Düsseldorf, Germany), 2014 [An earlier collection of novellas which later appeared in a slightly different format in the 2017 novel, The Curious Case of Jan Torrentius.

The Man Who Loved Kuras, Salt, 2022.

Selected other fiction 
The Vanishing Point, Darklands 1, Hodder, UK, 1991
A Friend in the Country, The European, 1993
Dutch Interior, Panurge 19, 1993
The Window, Critical Quarterly, 1993
Meeting Julie Christie, Time Out Net Books, 1995
Green To Blue, The Third Alternative, 2000
New York Movie, Linnaean Street, 2002
The Removal, Carriage House Review, 2002
Alsiso, The Alsiso Project, 2004
Indulgence, Smokelong Quarterly, 2004
Disappearing, FRIGG, 2005
The Counterfeit Smile, The Paumanok Review, 2005 
The Study of Sleep, eNovella, Wind River Press, 2005
The Transfer, Night Train, 2008
The Sermon, Night Train, 2008
The Tower, Elasticity: The Best of Elastic Press, ed. Andrew Hook, 2017
The Shore, Infra Noir, 2018
The Mask, Milk, 2017 (reprinted in Best British Short Stories 2018, ed. Nicholas Royle, 2018

References

External links 
 Article on Vermeer-inspired novels
 Historical Novel Society review of The Dance of Geometry
 Review of The Curious Case of Jan Torrentius in Seventeenth Century News
 Author interview on Bibliophage website

1961 births
Living people
Nationality missing
Place of birth missing (living people)
British male short story writers
British male novelists
British expatriates in Japan